The 2011 Nigeria Entertainment Awards was the 6th edition of the ceremony to reward outstanding contribution to Nigerian entertainment industry. It was held at Sharp Theater, Symphony Space, New York City on September 5, 2011. It was hosted by Funke Akindele and Julius Agwu.

Awards

Music
 Album of the Year
Asa – Beautiful Imperfection
Sound Sultan – Back From The Future
Darey – Double Dare
Duncan Mighty – Legacy
MI – MI2
Naeto C – Super C Season

 Hottest Single Of The Year
D’Prince – "Give It To Me" ft. Dbanj
Duncan Mighty – "Obianuju"
Ice Prince – "Oleku" ft. Brymo
J-Martins – "Jupa"
Wizkid – "Tease Me"
Dbanj – "Mr. Endowed Remix" ft. Snoop Dogg & Don Jazzy

 Best New Act Of The Year
Dr. Sid
Ice Prince
Mo’Cheddah
Tiwa Savage
Waje
Wizkid

 Gospel Artist Of The Year
Bouqoi
Frank Edwards
Kenny St. Brown
Lara George
Sinach

 Best Pop/R&B Artist Of The Year
Banky W
Darey Art Alade
Dbanj
Tuface
Waje
Wizkid

 Best Rap Act Of The Year
Eva Alordiah
Ice Prince
MI
Naeto C
Ruggedman
Terry Tha Rapman

 Music Producer Of The Year
Cobhams Asuquo
Don Jazzy
Samklef
Sossick
Dokta Frabz

 Best International Artist
Asa
JJC
Mo Eazy
Ndu
Nneka
May7ven

 Best Music Video Of The Year
Darey Art Alade– "Ba Ni Kidi" (Mark Hofmeyr)
Olamide – "Eni Duro" (DJ Tee)
Omawumi – "If You Ask Me" (Clarence Peters)
Konga – "Kaba Kaba" (Akin Alabi)
Bez – "More You" (Kemi Adetiba)
Dbanj – "Mr. Endowed Remix" (Sesan)

 Most Promising Act To Watch
Olamide
Retta
Vector
Zara
Brymo
Jhybo
Munachi Abii
Ketch-Up

 Pan-African Artist or Group Of The Year
Awilo Longoba
VIP
Winky D
Fally Ipupa
Juliana Kanyomozi
R2Bees

 Best US Based Male Artist Of The Year
Cap B
Dami Oloye
Duncan Daniels
Kunzo
Rotimi
T-Money

 Best US Based Female Artist Of The Year
Moyeen
Naira
Nnenna Yvonne
Titi Lokei
Tolumide
Zaina

 Indigenous Artist Of The Year
Duncan Mighty
Flavour
Solek
9ice
Jah Bless
Jodie

Film/TV

 Best Actor In A Film/Short Story
Chet Anekwe – Tobi
Femi Adebayo – Jelili
Odunlade Adekola – Emi ni Ire Kan
Ramsey Noah – A Private Storm
Hakeem Kae Kassim – Inale
Pascal Atuma – Okoto the Messenger

 Best Actress In A Film/Short Story
Mercy Johnson – Heart of a Widow
Omoni Oboli – Anchor Baby (film)
Omotola Jalade – Ije
Uche Jombo – Nollywood Hustlers
Caroline Chikezie – Inale
Genevieve Nnaji – Tango with Me

 Best Picture (Producer)
Adesuwa – Lancelot Oduwa Imaseun
Anchor Baby – Lonzo Nzekwe
Ije – Chineze AnyaeneInale – Jeta AmataTango with Me – Mahmood Ali-BalogunThe Mirror Boy – Obi Emelonye

 Best Actor In TV Series/Reality/Game Show
Kin Lewis – SpiderFrank Edoho – Who wants to be a MillionaireUche Sam Anyamele – About to WedVictor Olaotan – TinselEmeka Ossai – Clinic MattersGideon Okeke – Tinsel Best Actress In TV Series/Reality/Game Show
 Amanda Ebeye – City SistasDamilola Adegbite – TinselFunmi Eko – City SistasMissi Molu – Nigerian IdolUfuoma Ejenobor – Royal RootsMatilda Obaseki – Tinsel Pan-African Actress Of The Year (Film/Short Story)
Akofa Aiedu
Ama K. Abebrese
Nadia Buari
Yvonne Okoro
Jackie Appiah
Yvonne Cherrie

 Pan-African Actor Of The Year (Film/Short Story)
Chris Attoh
Edward Kagutuzi
John Dumelo
Chris Attoh
Majid Michel
Van Vicker

 Best Directing In A Film/Short Story
Lonzo Nzekwe – Anchor BabyJeta Amata – InaleMahmood Ali-Balogun – Tango with MeLancelot Imasuen & Ikechukwu Onyeka – A Private Storm IjePascal Atuma – Okoto the Messenger''

Others
 Comedian Of The Year
CD John (late)
Gandoki
Gordon
Helen Paul
Yvonne Orji
Daniel-d-humorous

 Best World DJ Nominees
DJ Afoo (New York)
DJ Caise (Nigeria)
DJ E Cool (Atlanta)
DJ Jam Jam (UK)
DJ Obi (Boston)
DJ Smooth (DC/MD)
DJ Tommy (Nigeria)
DJ Flava (Malaysia)

 Entertainment Executive Of The Year
Audu Makori (Chocolate City)
Banky W. (Empire Mates Entertainment)
Don Jazzy (Mo’hits)
Eldee (Trybe Records)
Obi Asika (Storm Records)
Tony Nwakalor (Yes Media)

 Promoter Of The Year
Ciba Entertainment (Houston)
Cokobar (UK)
Starmix (UK)
Stronghold (Malaysia)
Industry Nite (Lagos)

References

Nigeria Entertainment Awards
Nigeria Entertainment Awards
Ent 
Ent
Nigeria Entertainment Awards
Nigeria Entertainment Awards
Nigeria Entertainment Awards